Cláudia Teresa Pires Neto (born 18 April 1988) is a Portuguese footballer who plays as a midfielder for Fiorentina of the Italian Serie A.

Club career
Neto started playing futsal with UAC Lagos. In 2008, she turned to association football and signed for Prainsa Zaragoza in Spain's Superliga. Five years later she moved to RCD Espanyol, where she played just one season. Neto moved to Sweden and signed with Linköpings FC in 2014.

International career
Neto served as captain of the Portuguese national team, helping guide the team to the 2017 UEFA Women's European Championships. She retired from international football in September 2021 having scored 19 goals in 135 caps since her debut in March 2006.

Honours 

 Damallsvenskan: Winner (2) 2016, 2017
 Svenska Cupen: Winner (2) 2013–14, 2014–15

References

External links
 
 
 
  
 

1988 births
Living people
Portuguese women's footballers
Portugal women's international footballers
Portuguese expatriate women's footballers
Expatriate women's footballers in Spain
Expatriate women's footballers in Sweden
Portuguese expatriate sportspeople in Spain
Portuguese expatriate sportspeople in Sweden
Damallsvenskan players
Linköpings FC players
Primera División (women) players
RCD Espanyol Femenino players
VfL Wolfsburg (women) players
Zaragoza CFF players
People from Portimão
Women's association football midfielders
FIFA Century Club
Fiorentina Women's F.C. players
Portuguese expatriate sportspeople in Italy
Expatriate women's footballers in Italy
Serie A (women's football) players
Frauen-Bundesliga players
Portuguese expatriate sportspeople in Germany
Expatriate women's footballers in Germany
Sportspeople from Faro District
UEFA Women's Euro 2017 players